The 2005–06 First League of the Federation of Bosnia and Herzegovina season was the sixth since its establishment.

League standings

External links
RSSSF.org

First League of the Federation of Bosnia and Herzegovina seasons
Bosnia
2005–06 in Bosnia and Herzegovina football